Ban Napho is a village in Sainyabuli Province, Laos. It is located to the northeast of Muang Saiapoun, and southwest of Muang Pa.

References

Populated places in Sainyabuli Province